Geodesy is the Earth science of accurately measuring and understanding Earth's figure.

Geodetic may also refer to:
 Geodetic Hills, mountains in Canada
 Geodetic Glacier, glacier in Antarctica
 Geodetic graph, a type of graph
 Geodetic effect, a prediction of general relativity

See also
 
 Geodesic (disambiguation)